German submarine U-18 was a Type IIB U-boat of Nazi Germany's Kriegsmarine during World War II. It was laid down 10 July 1935 and commissioned on 4 January 1936. It served in many U-boat flotillas during its service.

Design
German Type IIB submarines were enlarged versions of the original Type IIs. U-18 had a displacement of  when at the surface and  while submerged. She had two shafts and two  propellers.

U-18 was fitted with three  torpedo tubes at the bow, five torpedoes or up to twelve Type A torpedo mines, and a  anti-aircraft gun. The boat had a complement of twenty-five.

Fate
While a training boat, U-18 sank at 0954 hrs on 20 November 1936 in Lübeck Bay, after a collision with T-156. Eight men died and 12 survived. It was raised on 28 November 1936. It returned to service on 30 September 1937. Starting late 1942 she served in the 30th U-boat Flotilla, after being transported in sections along the Danube to the Romanian port of Galați. She was then re-assembled by the Romanians at the Galați shipyard and sent to the Black Sea.

On 20 August 1944, in a Soviet air raid on the Romanian harbor of Constanţa in the Black Sea, U-18 was damaged and as a result was deemed not seaworthy and was scuttled on the 25th.

The boat was raised by the USSR in late 1944. It was sunk for target practice by the Soviet submarine  on 26 May 1947 off Sevastopol (also sunk that day was the former ).

Summary of raiding history

References

Notes

Citations

Bibliography

External links
 

German Type II submarines
U-boats commissioned in 1936
World War II submarines of Germany
World War II shipwrecks in the Black Sea
Germany–Soviet Union relations
Ships sunk as targets
1935 ships
U-boats scuttled in 1944
Ships built in Kiel
Ships built in Romania
Maritime incidents in August 1944